Nexosa aureola is a species of moth of the family Tortricidae. It is found in New Guinea.

The wingspan is about 11 mm. The forewings are tawny-fuscous, becoming yellow on the base and costa. The hindwings are light yellow, becoming pale orange on the posterior one-third and bright orange on the apical one-fourth.

Etymology
The species name is derived from aureoles (meaning lovely).

References

Moths described in 1977
Nexosa